Synkov-Slemeno is a municipality in Rychnov nad Kněžnou District in the Hradec Králové Region of the Czech Republic. It has about 400 inhabitants.

Administrative parts
The municipality is made up of villages of Jedlina, Slemeno and Synkov.

References

Villages in Rychnov nad Kněžnou District